Kasana may refer to:

 Kasana, Iran, a village in Iran
 Panjan kasana, a town in Pakistan
 Vipin Kasana, Indian athlete

See also 
 Roman Catholic Diocese of Kasana–Luweero, Uganda